The 2010 Navarra Superleague Formula round was a Superleague Formula round  held on October 24, 2010, at the Circuito de Navarra circuit, Los Arcos, Spain. It was Superleague Formula's first visit to the newly built circuit and the second round of the 2010 season to be held in Spain, after the Jarama round. It was the eleventh and final showdown championship  (the twelfth overall) of the 2010 Superleague Formula season.

Eighteen clubs took part including Spanish clubs Atlético Madrid and Sevilla FC.

Support races came from the equally prestigious FIA GT1 World Championship.

Report

Qualifying

Race 1

Race 2

Super Final

Results

Qualifying
 In each group, the top four qualify for the quarter-finals.

Group A

Group B

Knockout stages

Grid

Race 1

Race 2

Super Final

Standings after the round

References

External links
 Official results from the Superleague Formula website

Navarra
Superleague Formula Navarra